Gian Giacomo Veneroso (Genoa, 6 April 1701 - Chiavari, 17 November 1758) was the 163rd Doge of the Republic of Genoa.

Biography 
Veneroso was elected doge in June 1754. He ended his assignment on June 23, 1756, returning to the position of Magistrate of the Walls. After this, he was also magistrate of war. He had a son named Gerolamo.

See also 

 Republic of Genoa
 Doge of Genoa

Sources 

 Buonadonna, Sergio. Rosso doge. I dogi della Repubblica di Genova dal 1339 al 1797.

18th-century Doges of Genoa
1701 births
1758 deaths